Roberto Amadei (13 February 1933 – 29 December 2009) was the former Roman Catholic bishop of the diocese of Bergamo, Italy.

Biography
Amadei was born in Verdello, a small town near Bergamo in Lombardy.
In 1944 he joined the minor seminary at Clusone where he earned the equivalent of a high school diploma.  Subsequently, he was enrolled in the major seminary in Rome.

He took Holy Orders and became a priest on 16 March 1957.  After his ordination, he remained in Rome until he had completed a comprehensive course of study in church history at the Gregorian University.

From 1960 to 1990, he taught church history at the seminary of Bergamo. During his tenure as a teacher there, he was also the headmaster of the theology school from 1969 to 1981. Bishop Giulio Oggioni named him rector of the seminary in 1981.

In 1991, Pope John Paul II named Monsignor Amadei to be Bishop of Savona, and, in 1993, he was transferred to the Diocese of Bergamo as bishop. On 22 January 2009 pope Benedict XVI accept his resignation from the post of bishop of Bergamo and named him Apostolic administrator sede vacante. Amadei left the office of administrator on 15 March 2009 when his successor Francesco Beschi began his service as bishop of Bergamo.
On 10 October Francesco Beschi announced that Amadei has received the Anointing of the Sick.
He died on 29 December 2009 in Bergamo.

References

External links and additional sources
 (for Chronology of Bishops) 
 (for Chronology of Bishops) 

1933 births
2009 deaths
Bishops of Bergamo
Bishops of Savona
20th-century Italian Roman Catholic bishops
21st-century Italian Roman Catholic bishops
Clergy from the Province of Bergamo
Pontifical Gregorian University alumni